The 2014 FIA WTCC Race of Austria was the fifth round of the 2014 World Touring Car Championship season and the third running of the FIA WTCC Race of Austria. It was held on 25 May 2014 at the Salzburgring in Salzburg, Austria.

Both races were won by Citroën Total WTCC, as Yvan Muller won race one and José María López won race two.

Background
López continued to lead the drivers' championship after four rounds, twenty–five points ahead of teammate Sébastien Loeb. Franz Engstler held the lead of the Yokohama Trophy.

Report

Testing and free practice
López was quickest in the shortened test session on Friday with Campos Racing's Hugo Valente second and Mehdi Bennani third in the Proteam Racing Honda. Tom Coronel stopped on the back straight after suffering a puncture at the first chicane while Gabriele Tarquini also stopped on the circuit with technical problems. The two cars stopped on the circuit brought out the red flags three minutes before the end of the session which did not resume.

Free practice one saw López set the pace once again in a session which saw two red flags. The first occurred halfway through when Pasquale Di Sabatino spun at turn ten and collided with the barriers. The session was stopped once again with one minute to go when the Lada of Mikhail Kozlovskiy stopped on the circuit with electrical problems.

Loeb led a Citroën 1–2–3 in practice two which was interrupted by a red flag once again when Valente crashed into the barriers and bounced back across the circuit. The amounting damage to Valente's car was expected to rule him out for the rest of the weekend, but Valente's car was repaired for the races.

Qualifying
Yvan Muller was quickest in the first part of qualifying, while the three Lukoil Lada Sport TC1 cars of James Thompson, Robert Huff and Mikhail Kozlovskiy were the only three taking part in the session, that failed to progress to Q2.

The second session was stopped midway through due to a crash for Campos Racing's Dušan Borković; he did not set a time and ended the session in 12th place. Muller remained quickest with Coronel second and Gianni Morbidelli third ahead of the other two Citroëns of Loeb and López. Tarquini was tenth and took pole position for race two.

In the Q3 shootout it was Morbidelli who claimed pole position, the first for a non–Citroën driver in 2014. Muller and Loeb were second and third with Coronel fourth ahead of championship leader López.

After qualifying it was found Morbidelli had improved his Q1 time under yellow flags, he was given a five–place grid penalty with Muller inheriting pole position for race one.

Race One
Muller led away from pole while Coronel passed Loeb to get into second place at the first corner. The move allowed López and Monteiro to get ahead of Loeb; further around the lap Loeb was able to re–pass Monteiro and move into fourth position. On lap five Norbert Michelisz ran wide at turn five which allowed Tarquini to move up to eighth place; Morbidelli had dropped down the order from sixth on the grid and was running tenth. On lap eight López locked up and went straight on at the first chicane, when he returned to the track he had dropped down to third behind Coronel. Coronel kept López at bay for the rest of the race as Muller claimed the win. Franz Engstler was the winner in the TC2 class.

Race Two
Tarquini started on pole position, while Monteiro – starting from fourth – dived between Mehdi Bennani and Michelisz ahead of him. Behind them the Lada of Thompson was tapped and spun across the circuit, collecting his teammate Huff and colliding with Muller who would need to return to the pits for repairs. Both Ladas were stopped on the pit straight and safety car came out onto the circuit. Under safety car conditions Tom Chilton's right rear wheel came off and went underneath his car, pulling the floor of his Chevrolet Cruze off and leaving him stranded across the circuit. At the same time the Campos Chevrolet of Borković also stopped at the side of the circuit. At this point the red flag came out. The race resumed with Tarquini leading Monteiro, Michelisz and Bennani. López in fifth place was the best placed non–Honda car and on lap five he was able to pass Bennani to take fourth place. On lap six Morbidelli passed Loeb on the back straight while López picked off Michelisz for third. By lap seven Monteiro was under attack from López and lost second place to him. Morbidelli was also moving through the field and passed Bennani for sixth place. On lap 11 Coronel ran wide on the gravel at turn one which had been spread across the track by René Münnich the lap previously. This gave Morbidelli the opportunity to try and pass Coronel before the safety car came out for the circuit to be swept clean. On the restart Tarquini left it late to go as he looked to defend from López, the Citroen passed the Honda on the back straight to take the lead. Coronel and Morbidelli tried to pass Michelisz on the final lap but could not get around the Honda as López claimed the win.

Results

Qualifying

Bold denotes Pole position for second race.

 — Morbidelli was given a five–place grid penalty after qualifying for ignoring yellow flags, he was allowed to keep the five points for pole position.

Race 1

Bold denotes Fastest lap.

Race 2

Bold denotes Fastest lap.

 — John Filippi received a 30 second penalty.

Standings after the event

Drivers' Championship standings

Yokohama Trophy standings

Manufacturers' Championship standings

 Note: Only the top five positions are included for both sets of drivers' standings.

References

External links
World Touring Car Championship official website

Austria
FIA WTCC Race of Austria